David Yelland is the name of:

David Yelland (actor) (born 1947), English actor
David Yelland (journalist) (born 1963), English journalist and newspaper editor